Gentian is a neighborhood Columbus, Georgia. The boundaries are generally acknowledged to be Moon Road and the Columbus Airport  to the north, Reese Road to the south, I-185 to the west, and Miller Road to the east. It is also home to Cooper Creek Park.

References 

Columbus metropolitan area, Georgia
Neighborhoods in Columbus, Georgia